Sascha Viertl (born 1 November 1990) is an Austrian footballer who currently plays as a midfielder for SV Leobendorf.

External links
 

1990 births
Living people
Austrian footballers
Floridsdorfer AC players
2. Liga (Austria) players
Association football midfielders